Kusín is a village and municipality in Michalovce District in the Kosice Region of eastern Slovakia.

History
In historical records the village was first mentioned in 1418.

Geography
The village lies at an altitude of 116 metres and covers an area of 9.815 km².

Culture
The village has a public library and a football pitch.

Gallery

See also
 List of municipalities and towns in Michalovce District
 List of municipalities and towns in Slovakia

References

External links

Website
https://web.archive.org/web/20071027094149/http://www.statistics.sk/mosmis/eng/run.html

Villages and municipalities in Michalovce District